Dmitri Shostakovich's String Quartet No. 1 in C major, Op. 49, was composed in six weeks during the summer of 1938. It carries no dedication. Shostakovich said that in this quartet he had "visualized childhood scenes, somewhat naïve and bright moods associated with spring."

Premiere
The work was premiered in Leningrad on 10 October 1938 by the Glazunov Quartet.  It was also premiered in Moscow on 16 November 1938 by the Beethoven Quartet.  This premiere began a lifelong friendship between Shostakovich and the quartet.

Structure
In the traditional style of a string quartet, the work has four movements:

Playing time is approximately 15 minutes.

First movement
The first movement, in C major, is in sonata-allegro form. The exposition starts with flowing chords under an opening theme, which then moves to a contrasting second theme. After a brief development section and recapitulation, the movement comes to a close.

Second movement
The slow second movement, in A minor, consists of eight variations on a folk-like melody first played on the solo viola. The movement ends with a pizzicato A minor chord.

Third movement
The third movement, a scherzo, is set in the remote key of C minor. It begins with a rapid theme in  time, before moving on to the trio in F major which is slightly more relaxed in tempo. The scherzo is repeated again, with the coda briefly recalling the trio theme.

Fourth movement
The last movement returns to the home key of C major.

References
Notes

Sources

External links
 
 
  
 

01
1938 compositions
Compositions in C major